The Athlete is a 1932 short animated film by Walter Lantz Productions, and distributed by Universal Pictures. The film is the first of a film series featuring Pooch the Pup, the first star character created by Walter Lantz.

Plot
Pooch is a participant in a number of track and field events. His first event is a sprinting competition. Because of poor signaling from the signal man, Pooch runs but the other competitors remain in their starting position. Pooch reaches the finish line but fails to come across as the tape slings him back to the starting line. The signal man restarts the race, and this time all the runners make their move. Pooch again reaches the finish line but again gets sling back by the tape. His second flight also causes him to push back the other runners. Pooch resumes his run and wins the race, thanks to the absence of the tape at the end of the track.

Next, Pooch enters the pole vault event. After failing to go over the bar twice, an official lowers it but Pooch still fails at third attempt. The official lowers the bar one more time. Pooch finally makes it over but goes too far and lands on a tree.

In the third event, Pooch tries to hurl a large hammer head attached to a string, a contest similar to trying to throw a metal ball attached to a chain. But instead of the hammer head being thrown, Pooch gets airborne before landing in a trash bin a few miles away. Pooch rides a taxi to return to the competition.

The fourth and final event involves jumping into a tub filled with water from a highly elevated plank. But as Pooch leaps, the tub somehow moves, and therefore an official sends him back up. And when Pooch plunges again, everyone below moves away instead of breaking his fall. Pooch plummets into the ground, creating a deep hole as a result. Surprisingly, a Tibetan man from the hole picks up and places him back on the surface.

For some reason, Pooch is declared the winner of the competition. An official presents him a trophy, and a cameraman tries to take a photo of him. But the camera's flash is too powerful that it kills almost everybody at the scene. Pooch, however, survives, wondering what just happened. All the others that perished are seen in white wings, floating towards the sky.

External links
The Athlete at the Big Cartoon Database

1932 animated films
1932 comedy films
1932 films
American black-and-white films
Films directed by Walter Lantz
Walter Lantz Productions shorts
1930s American animated films
American comedy short films
Animated films about dogs
Universal Pictures animated short films
1930s English-language films